Instituto Superior de Agronomía (ISA), School of Agronomy – University of Lisbon, is a national and international renowned faculty of excellence for graduate and post-graduate studies in Agronomy, Forestry, Food Science, Landscape Architecture, Environment, Animal Production, Plant Protection, Economy and Rural Sociology and Botany and Biological Engineering.

Dynamic academic education and research and development have been a priority for the past 150 years. The faculty is currently ongoing an extensive reform that will be fully implemented by the coming year of 2008, with all graduation and post-graduation levels being in a European format.

The student population is over 1500 in three levels of studying, including post-doctoral research studies. The teaching staff consists of 145 teachers and 6 researchers, mainly PhDs and post-docs and is organized in 10 departments.

This vast protected area, classified as of “Public Interest”, plays an important role in the city’s environmental balance and is a fundamental recreational landscape for Lisbon’s population.

It also includes a small conference centre with a 300-delegate capacity, an Exhibition Pavilion with a Victorian (iron/Eiffel-like) architecture, several gardens, rugby and football fields and other facilities all of which can also be used by the city community.

ISA is executive board of a European project: FIRE PARADOX. Francisco Rego is the coordinator of this project. The aim is to learn to live with fire.

Degrees

Main graduation areas (1st cycle) - 180 ECTS 

Biology
Engineering Sciences of
Agronomy
Animal husbandry
Environment
Food 
Forestry

Science Master degrees (2nd cycle) - 120 ECTS 

Agricultural Engineering
Applied Mathematics in Biological Sciences
Environmental Engineering
Food Engineering
Forestry Engineering and Natural Resources
Functional Biology
Natural Resources Management and Conservation
Animal Science

1st+2nd cycles - 300 ECTS

Landscape Architecture

PhDs (3rd cycle)

Agronomy
Food Science and Engineering
Biology
Environment Engineering
Forestry 
Landscape Architecture
Mathematics and Statistics
Rural Engineering
Bio-systems Engineering
Animal Husbandry Engineering

Notable alumni
People who have been awarded a degree by ISA or otherwise have attended it, include:
Amílcar Cabral, Guinea-Bissauan independentist, guerrilla, agronomist.
Dom Duarte, 24th Duke of Braganza, claimant to the throne of Portugal, agronomist.
Tim, musician, vocalist of Xutos & Pontapés, agronomist.

See also
Agriculture in Portugal
Technical University of Lisbon

References

Technical University of Lisbon
Agronomy schools